Stocco is a surname. Notable people with the surname include:

 Giampietro Stocco (born 1961), Italian author
 John Stocco (born 1983), former collegiate American football quarterback